Araban District is a district of Gaziantep Province of Turkey. Its seat is the city of Araban, which had 12,240 inhabitants as of 31 December 2022.

References

Districts of Gaziantep Province